Oleksandr Vasylovych Aliksiychuk (born 6 March 1981) is a Ukrainian politician currently serving as a People's Deputy of Ukraine from Ukraine's 154th electoral district since 29 August 2019 as a member of Servant of the People.

Early life and career 
He is also a graduate of the National Academy for Public Administration with a specialisation in parliamentarism and public administration.

Prior to his entrance in politics, Aliksiychuk worked in the construction industry, particularly at the companies Torhbud-Servis LLC and Budtekh-Plus LLC. He was also active in philanthropy, working at the DRUH All-Ukrainian Fund for Assisting the Families of Ukraine's Heroes and organising children's sporting events in the city of Rivne and Rivne Oblast.

Political career 
In the 2019 Ukrainian presidential election's first round, Aliksiychuk participated in the campaign of Andriy Sadovyi prior to Sadovyi's withdrawal from the race.

Aliksiychuk ran in the 2019 Ukrainian parliamentary election as the candidate nominated by Servant of the People for the position of People's Deputy of Ukraine in Ukraine's 154th electoral district, consisting of the city of Dubno and surrounding areas. At the time of the election, he was an independent. Aliksiychuk was successfully elected, winning with 36.01% of the vote compared to 15.33% of the vote garnered by incumbent People's Deputy . In the Verkhovna Rada (Ukraine's parliament), Aliksiychuk joined the Verkhovna Rada Committees on Organisation of State Power and Local Self-Rule, Regional Development, and Urban Planning.

On 11 November 2021, Aliksiychuk's car was set on fire by unknown individuals. At the time, the car was being used by Artur Byts, an assistant of Aliksiychuk. Byts and Aliksiychuk both stated that they suspected political reasons were behind the fire.

References 

1981 births
Living people
Ninth convocation members of the Verkhovna Rada
Servant of the People (political party) politicians
People from Rivne Oblast